"You're the One" is a single from freestyle singer Sandeé.

Track listing
U.S. 12-inch Single

Charts

References

1987 singles
Sandeé songs
1987 songs
Atlantic Records singles